Desmodus draculae is an extinct species of vampire bat that inhabited Central and South America during the Pleistocene, and possibly the early Holocene. It was 30% larger than its living relative the common vampire bat (Desmodus rotundus). Fossils and unmineralized subfossils have been found in Argentina, Mexico, Ecuador, Brazil, Venezuela, Belize, and Bolivia.

Most records of D. draculae are from the late Pleistocene, but some are from the Holocene. A Desmodus canine tooth discovered in Buenos Aires Province, Argentina came from sediments dated at 300 years BP (ca. 1650 A.D.); this fossil was tentatively assigned to D. draculae.

Taxonomy and etymology 
The first Desmodus draculae fossil was located in Cueva del Guácharo in Venezuela in 1965 by Omar J. Linares, which he noted in 1968 as a possible Pleistocene species of Desmodus.
A formal and accepted description of the species was published in 1988, designating the collection by Linares, a skull and post-cranial material, as the type specimen.

The authors assigned the specific epithet draculae, noting "the largest known chiropteran vampire commemorates Count Dracula, the greatest human vampire of folklore", and placed the novel species with the genus Desmodus.
Desmodus draculae has been occasionally called the giant vampire bat in reference to its greater relative size.

Description 
It is the largest-known vampire bat to have ever lived. Its skull was long and narrow, and its face had an upturned snout.

The proportions are equivalent to a smaller megabat or larger microbat of modern chiropteran fauna.

Biology 
Some researchers believe that D. draculae would have preyed on megafauna, while others believe that they would have preyed on Caviomorpha. Other potential prey items that would have been available to D. draculae include plains viscacha, deer, and camelids.

Range and habitat 
Fossils of D. draculae have been found in Mexico, Belize, Venezuela, Brazil, and Argentina, in six caves total.
Though there are no fossils to corroborate this, it is believed that its range might have included Ecuador, French Guiana, and Guyana.
The species was likely widely distributed throughout South America.

Extinction 
The species is regarded as geologically extinct, as only bones of it have been documented and it has not been reported in surveys. However, its extinction is assumed to be geologically recent, as some of its remains discovered were not yet fossilized. The date and reason for its extinction are currently unknown. One hypothesis for its extinction states that it was highly specialized on megafaunal mammals as prey, which became extinct in the Quaternary extinction event, and D. draculae was unable to switch to smaller prey.
Anecdotal reports of "large bats attacking cattle and horses" in Brazil are likely first-hand exaggerations of bat species whose behaviour is recorded as interacting with these animals.

In culture 
It has been speculated that D. draculae was part of the inspiration for the Mayan bat-god Camazotz. D. draculae could have also inspired legends of the Mura people, an indigenous people in Brazil, about the Caoera—a blood-eating bat the size of a vulture.

Notes and references

External links 
 D. draculae skull (figure C) compared to the three living vampire bats' skulls

draculae
Pleistocene bats
Holocene extinctions
Pleistocene mammals of South America
Uquian
Ensenadan
Lujanian
Pleistocene Argentina
Fossils of Argentina
Pleistocene Brazil
Fossils of Brazil
Pleistocene Venezuela
Fossils of Venezuela
Pleistocene mammals of North America
Pleistocene Mexico
Fossils of Mexico
Fossil taxa described in 1988
Mammals described in 1988
Vampire bats